Aesculin, also called æsculin or esculin, is a coumarin glucoside that naturally occurs in the trees horse chestnut (Aesculus hippocastanum), California buckeye (Aesculus californica), prickly box (Bursaria spinosa), and daphnin (the dark green resin of Daphne mezereum). It is also found in dandelion coffee.

Medical uses 
As medication, aesculin is sometimes used as a vasoprotective agent.

Aesculin is also used in a microbiology laboratory to aid in the identification of bacterial species (especially Enterococci and Listeria). In fact, all strains of Group D Streptococci hydrolyze æsculin in 40% bile.

Aesculin hydrolysis test 
Aesculin is incorporated into agar with ferric citrate and bile salts (bile aesculin agar). Hydrolysis of aesculin forms aesculetin (6,7-dihydroxycoumarin) and glucose. Aesculetin forms dark brown or black complexes with ferric citrate, allowing the test to be read.

The presence of a dark brown or black halo indicates that the test is positive. A positive test can occur with Enterococcus, Aerococcus, and Leuconostoc. Aesculin will fluoresce under long wave ultraviolet light (360 nm) and hydrolysis of aesculin results in loss of this fluorescence.

Enterococcus will often flag positive within four hours of the agar being inoculated.

Warnings
Aesculin ingestion can produce stomach ache, spasms, diarrhea, disorientation and even death at high doses.

References 

Coumarin glycosides
Microbiological media ingredients